Barrington is a borough in Camden County, in the U.S. state of New Jersey. As of the 2020 United States census, the borough's population was 7,075, an increase of 92 (+1.3%) from the 2010 census count of 6,983, which in turn reflected a decline of 101 (-1.4%) from the 7,084 counted in the 2000 census.

The area became known as "Barrington" in the 1880s, when William Simpson, one of the partners that developed the area, chose the name from his home in Great Barrington, Massachusetts.

Barrington was incorporated as a borough on March 27, 1917, from portions of the now-defunct Centre Township, based on the results of a referendum held on April 17, 1917. Portions of the borough were taken on March 24, 1926, to form Lawnside.

The borough had the 30th-highest property tax rate in New Jersey, with an equalized rate of 4.069% in 2020, compared to 3.470% in the county as a whole and a statewide average of 2.279%.

Geography
According to the United States Census Bureau, The borough had a total area of 1.58 square miles (4.10 km2), all of which was land.

The borough borders the Camden County municipalities of Bellmawr, Haddon Heights, Haddonfield, Lawnside, Magnolia, Runnemede and Tavistock.

Demographics

2010 census

The Census Bureau's 2006–2010 American Community Survey showed that (in 2010 inflation-adjusted dollars) median household income was $56,681 (with a margin of error of +/− $6,097) and the median family income was $81,398 (+/− $9,410). Males had a median income of $48,028 (+/− $7,016) versus $41,534 (+/− $5,225) for females. The per capita income for the borough was $29,987 (+/− $2,091). About 2.0% of families and 3.3% of the population were below the poverty line, including 5.3% of those under age 18 and 7.1% of those age 65 or over.

2000 census
As of the 2000 United States census there were 7,084 people, 3,028 households, and 1,831 families residing in the borough. The racial makeup of the borough was 91.61% White, 4.16% African American, 0.24% Native American, 1.44% Asian, 0.04% Pacific Islander, 1.07% from other races, and 1.43% from two or more races. Hispanic or Latino of any race were 2.84% of the population.

There were 3,028 households, out of which 25.9% had children under the age of 18 living with them, 46.9% were married couples living together, 10.4% had a female householder with no husband present, and 39.5% were non-families. 33.6% of all households were made up of individuals, and 15.2% had someone living alone who was 65 years of age or older. The average household size was 2.34 and the average family size was 3.04.

In the borough the population was spread out, with 21.1% under the age of 18, 7.6% from 18 to 24, 32.2% from 25 to 44, 21.4% from 45 to 64, and 17.6% who were 65 years of age or older. The median age was 38 years. For every 100 females, there were 91.0 males. For every 100 females age 18 and over, there were 87.0 males.

The median income for a household in the borough was $45,148, and the median income for a family was $59,706. Males had a median income of $41,211 versus $31,927 for females. The per capita income for the borough was $24,434. About 0.4% of families and 1.9% of the population were below the poverty line, including 0.8% of those under age 18 and 2.2% of those age 65 or over.

Economy
Edmund Scientific Corporation had been based in the borough since 1942. The company store opened in 1952 and closed in 2001 when the consumer business was sold off and relocated to Tonawanda, New York. 

Barrington is also home to an International Paper box manufacturing facility.

Government

Local government
Barrington is governed under the Borough form of New Jersey municipal government, which is used in 218 municipalities (of the 564) statewide, making it the most common form of government in New Jersey. The governing body is comprised of a Mayor and a Borough Council, with all positions elected at-large on a partisan basis as part of the November general election. A Mayor is elected directly by the voters to a four-year term of office. The Borough Council is comprised of six members elected to serve three-year terms on a staggered basis, with two seats coming up for election each year in a three-year cycle.  The Borough form of government used by Barrington is a "weak mayor / strong council" government in which council members act as the legislative body with the mayor presiding at meetings and voting only in the event of a tie. The mayor can veto ordinances subject to an override by a two-thirds majority vote of the council. The mayor makes committee and liaison assignments for council members, and most appointments are made by the mayor with the advice and consent of the council.

, the Mayor of the Borough of Barrington is Democrat Patti Harris, whose term of office ends December 31, 2023. Members of the Borough Council are Council President Michael Beach (D, 2022), Vincent Cerrito (D, 2023), Michael Drumm (D, 2024), Kyle Hanson (D, 2023), Shawn Ludwig (D, 2024) and Wayne Robenolt (D, 2022).
Wayne Robenolt was elected to fill the vacant seat of Harry Vincent, who died in January 2012.

Federal, state and county representation
Barrington is located in the 1st Congressional district and is part of New Jersey's 5th state legislative district.

Politics
As of March 2011, there were a total of 4,823 registered voters in Barrington, of which 1,826 (37.9% vs. 31.7% countywide) were registered as Democrats, 860 (17.8% vs. 21.1%) were registered as Republicans and 2,132 (44.2% vs. 47.1%) were registered as Unaffiliated. There were 5 voters registered as Libertarians or Greens. Among the borough's 2010 Census population, 69.1% (vs. 57.1% in Camden County) were registered to vote, including 87.2% of those ages 18 and over (vs. 73.7% countywide).

In the 2012 presidential election, Democrat Barack Obama received 2,015 votes (59.3% vs. 54.8% countywide), ahead of Republican Mitt Romney with 1,310 votes (38.6% vs. 43.5%) and other candidates with 42 votes (1.2% vs. 0.9%), among the 3,398 ballots cast by the borough's 5,155 registered voters, for a turnout of 65.9% (vs. 70.4% in Camden County). In the 2008 presidential election, Democrat Barack Obama received 2,079 votes (57.8% vs. 66.2% countywide), ahead of Republican John McCain with 1,396 votes (38.8% vs. 30.7%) and other candidates with 60 votes (1.7% vs. 1.1%), among the 3,599 ballots cast by the borough's 4,936 registered voters, for a turnout of 72.9% (vs. 71.4% in Camden County). In the 2004 presidential election, Democrat John Kerry received 2,036 votes (56.8% vs. 61.7% countywide), ahead of Republican George W. Bush with 1,503 votes (42.0% vs. 36.4%) and other candidates with 27 votes (0.8% vs. 0.8%), among the 3,582 ballots cast by the borough's 4,679 registered voters, for a turnout of 76.6% (vs. 71.3% in the whole county).

In the 2013 gubernatorial election, Republican Chris Christie received 62.2% of the vote (1,147 cast), ahead of Democrat Barbara Buono with 35.4% (653 votes), and other candidates with 2.4% (45 votes), among the 1,904 ballots cast by the borough's 5,094 registered voters (59 ballots were spoiled), for a turnout of 37.4%. In the 2009 gubernatorial election, Republican Chris Christie received 998 votes (47.1% vs. 38.5% countywide), ahead of Democrat Jon Corzine with 929 votes (43.8% vs. 53.8%), Independent Chris Daggett with 130 votes (6.1% vs. 4.5%) and other candidates with 35 votes (1.7% vs. 1.1%), among the 2,119 ballots cast by the borough's 4,703 registered voters, yielding a 45.1% turnout (vs. 40.8% in the county).

Education
The Barrington Public Schools serve public school students in kindergarten through eighth grade. As of the 2020–21 school year, the district, comprised of two schools, had an enrollment of 567 students and 60.8 classroom teachers (on an FTE basis), for a student–teacher ratio of 9.3:1. Schools in the district (with 2020–21 enrollment data from the National Center for Education Statistics) are 
Avon Elementary School with 312 students in grades PreK-4 
Woodland Middle School with 251 students in grades 5 through 8.

For ninth through twelfth grades, public school students attend Haddon Heights Junior/Senior High School, which serves Haddon Heights, and students from Barrington, Lawnside and Merchantville who attend the high school as part of sending/receiving relationships with the Haddon Heights School District. The Haddon Heights district approved a contract in September 2013 with the Merchantville School District that would add about 80 students a year from Merchantville to the high school, in addition to the average of more than 260 students from Barrington and 120 from Lawnside that are sent to Haddon Heights each year. As of the 2020–21 school year, the high school had an enrollment of 997 students and 82.0 classroom teachers (on an FTE basis), for a student–teacher ratio of 12.2:1.

Students from Barrington, and from all of Camden County, are eligible to attend the Camden County Technical Schools, a countywide public school district that serves the vocational and technical education needs of students at the high school and post-secondary level at Gloucester Township Technical High School in the Sicklerville section of Gloucester Township or Pennsauken Technical High School in Pennsauken Township. Students are accepted based on district admission standards and costs of attendance and transportation are covered by the home district of each student.

St. Francis De Sales Regional School was an elementary school that operated under the auspices of the Roman Catholic Diocese of Camden. The school closed after the 2008–2009 school year in the face of declining enrollment and rising costs. Annunciation School in Bellmawr had been closed by the diocese at the end of the 2007–2008 school year and merged into the Barrington school.

Transportation

Roads and highways 

The New Jersey Turnpike is the most prominent highway traversing Barrington. The closest exit is Interchange 3 in neighboring Bellmawr / Runnemede.

Other major roads that pass through the borough include Interstate 295, which passes through briefly, with Exit 29 connecting the expressway with U.S. Route 30 and Route 41.

Public transportation 
NJ Transit bus service is available in the borough on routes 403 (between Turnersville and Camden) and 455 (between the Cherry Hill Mall and Paulsboro).

PATCO Speedline is a commuter rail system linking Philadelphia and Lindenwold. The stations closest to Barrington are Haddonfield and Woodcrest.

Notable people

People who were born in, residents of, or otherwise closely associated with Barrington include:

 Nilsa Cruz-Perez (born 1961), politician who has represented the 5th Legislative District in the New Jersey Senate since 2014
 Sarah K. Elfreth (born 1988), politician who serves in the Maryland Senate, representing the 30th district
 Nick Foles (born 1989), quarterback who has played for the Philadelphia Eagles and Jacksonville Jaguars
 Patricia Egan Jones, politician who has represented the 5th Legislative District in the New Jersey General Assembly since 2015
 Al Kenders (born 1937), catcher who played for the Philadelphia Phillies in 1961
 Bill Manlove (born 1933), football head coach who had a career record of 212–110–1 at Widener University, Delaware Valley College and La Salle University
 Charlie Manuel (born 1944), baseball executive for the Philadelphia Phillies, and a former professional baseball outfielder, coach, and manager in Major League Baseball
 Ernest F. Schuck (1929–2009), politician who served for seven years as mayor of Barrington and eight years in the New Jersey General Assembly, from 1974 to 1982, where he represented the 5th Legislative District
 Bo Wood (born 1945), former American football player and high school coach, who played in the NFL for the Atlanta Falcons.

References

External links

 Barrington Borough web site
 Barrington Public Schools
 
 School Data for the Barrington Public Schools, National Center for Education Statistics

 
1917 establishments in New Jersey
Borough form of New Jersey government
Boroughs in Camden County, New Jersey
Populated places established in 1917